Clark House is a historic home located at Ticonderoga in Essex County, New York.  The home was built in 1921 and is a -story stone and shingle-sheathed American Craftsman–style building with a slate gable roof. Also on the property is a contributing cobblestone wall.

It was listed on the National Register of Historic Places in 1988.

References

Houses on the National Register of Historic Places in New York (state)
Houses completed in 1921
Bungalow architecture in New York (state)
American Craftsman architecture in New York (state)
Houses in Essex County, New York
National Register of Historic Places in Essex County, New York